The Imamzadeh Haroun-e-Velayat, or the Harun-i Vilayat Mausoleum, is an imamzadeh in Isfahan, Iran. It is located opposite the Ali minaret in Dardasht and belongs to the Ismail I era. There are many accounts of Harun Vilayat, the person who is buried in it. Some say that he is the seventh Imam's son and others, that he is the tenth Imam's son, but aside from the matter of who is buried in it, it is the most important historical structure related to the early Safavid era. Beyond the tomb it has also a portico, a tiled dome and a large yard.

It seems that some repairs and improvements were carried out in the Fath-Ali Shah era.

The mausoleum has become a shrine reputed to have miraculous powers and is also venerated by some Armenian Christians.

References

External links
 ArchNet.org: Harun-i Vilayat Mausoleum photos 
 ArchNet.org: Imamzadah Harun-i Vilayat
 Isfahan.org.uk: Haroun Vilayat – Shrine of Haroun Vilayat
 Researchgate.net: "Harun-i Vilayat Shrine of Isfahan: Its Quiddity and Religious Ties" (thesis Feb 2019 by Samaneh Pouremadi)

Further reading
Newman, Andrew (ed.), 2003: Society and Culture in the Early Modern Middle East: Studies on Iran in the Safavid Period. Brill: Leiden and Boston 

Shrines in Iran
Tombs in Iran
Mausoleums in Isfahan
Architecture in Iran